The Rape of El Morro is an album by American arranger/conductor and composer Don Sebesky featuring performances recorded in 1975 and released on the CTI label.

Track listing
All compositions by Don Sebesky except where noted
  "The Rape of El Morro" - 7:41 
 "Moon Dreams" (John Chalmers MacGregor, Johnny Mercer) - 5:30 
 "Skyliner" (Charlie Barnet, Billy Moore, Jr.) - 5:49 
 "The Entertainer" (Scott Joplin) - 4:12 
 "Footprints of the Giant" (based on themes by Béla Bartók; arranged and adapted by Don Sebesky) - 7:32 
 "Lucky Seven" - 5:28 
Recorded at Van Gelder Studio in Englewood Cliffs, New Jersey between April and May, 1975

Personnel
Don Sebesky - keyboards, arranger, conductor
Randy Brecker, Jon Faddis - trumpet
Wayne Andre, Barry Rogers, Sonny Russo - trombone
Tony Studd - bass trombone
Michael Brecker - tenor saxophone
David Sanborn - alto saxophone
Ray Beckenstetein - flute, alto flute, piccolo
Harvey Estrin, Walt Levinsky, George Marge, Al Regni - flute
Don Grolnick, Roland Hanna, Pat Rebillot - keyboards
Joe Beck - guitar
Ron Carter, Will Lee - bass
Steve Gadd - drums
George Devens, Phil Kraus - percussion
Harry Cykman, Paul Gershman, Harry Glickman, Emanuel Green, Harold Kohon, Charles Libove, Harry Lookofsky, David Nadien, Matthew Raimondi, David Rose - violin
Jean R. Dane, Manny Vardi - viola
Seymour Barab, Charles McCracken - cello
Joan LaBarbara - vocals
Bob Ciano, Richard Mantel - album design

References

CTI Records albums
Don Sebesky albums
1975 albums
Albums produced by Creed Taylor
Albums arranged by Don Sebesky
Albums recorded at Van Gelder Studio